Bracebridge West Aerodrome  is  west northwest of Bracebridge, Ontario, Canada.

See also

 List of airports in the Bracebridge area

References

Registered aerodromes in Ontario
Transport in Bracebridge, Ontario